The Secret Code is the fourth Japanese studio album (eighth overall) by South Korean pop group Tohoshinki, released on March 25, 2009 by Rhythm Zone. The album debuted at number two on the Oricon weekly chart. The Secret Code is Tohoshinki's last original studio album to feature members Jejung, Yuchun, and Junsu.

Chart performance
In Japan, The Secret Code debuted at number two on the Oricon daily charts selling nearly 83,000 copies. On the weekly chart the album took the number two spot selling over 157,900 copies, behind pop singer Ayumi Hamasaki's Next Level. The album seemed even more successful in Taiwan. On the J-Pop and Combo charts the album debuted at number-one, bringing in 51.1% and 12.09% of sales on their respective charts.

Singles
The first single that was released from the album was the double A-side, "Beautiful You/Sennen Koi Uta", on April 23, 2008. The single debuted at number-one on the Oricon singles charts. The second single was "Dōshite Kimi o Suki ni Natte Shimattandarō?", which was released on July 16, 2008. The third single was "Jumon: Mirotic", which was a Japanese language version of their lead single from their fourth Korean studio album with the same name. Two singles were released in 2009: the triple A-side "Bolero/Kiss the Baby Sky/Wasurenaide" and the last single from the album, "Survivor". All of the singles were number-ones for the group except "Survivor", which came in at number three on the Oricon chart.

Track listing

Charts

References

TVXQ albums
Avex Group albums
2009 albums
Japanese-language albums